People for Successful Corean Reunification (PSCORE) is a non-governmental organization based in Seoul, South Korea, and Washington D.C. in the United States. PSCORE addresses potential barriers to Korea reunification, suggests alternatives, and works to improve the situation of North Korean defectors in South Korea and China to bridge the gap between South Korea, North Korea, and the international community. The organization is made up of North and South Korean staff, interns and volunteers from South Korea and abroad, and North Korean defectors. While PSCORE provides news coverage on North Korea and helps defectors become South Korean citizens, a unique aspect is that educational programs are offered for North Korean defectors.

History
In October 2006, PSCORE was established by young North Korean defectors, South Korean university students, and foreigners in Korea interested in improving human rights in North Korea and the reunification of the Korean peninsula. The organization uses ‘C’ in the acronym ‘PSCORE’ to represent the pre-20th-century spelling "Corea", when the two countries were one.

Objectives
The organization encourages harmony and understanding between the two Koreas through educational programs, awareness campaigns, and discussion panels. To address the possible obstacles to reunification of North and South Korea, the organization suggests solutions to resolve such obstacles by creating space for discussing issues related to reunification, human rights, and North Korean democratization. It also seeks to fill gaps in the existent assimilation aid for North Korean defectors.
The organization is composed of those who share a common interest and passion for Korean reunification, human rights in North Korea, and to see North Korean defectors become self-supporting.

PSCORE's Work

Human Rights Data Collection and Analysis
Detailed evidence of human rights abuses in North Korea is collected through interviews with North Korean defectors living in South Korea. The data is used for written and visual depictions of the human rights crisis in North Korea to be accessible for the public. 
Here is a list of PSCORE's publications:

UN ECOSOC Consultative Status
In 2012, PSCORE received United Nations Economic and Social Council Consultative status. Consultative status enables an NGO to submit written statements to the United Nations Human Rights Council, speak at the sessions, attend UNHRC meetings and hold parallel events in the boundaries of the UN during UNHRC sessions. 

PSCORE partakes in the Universal Periodic Review (UPR) organized by the Human Rights Council and cooperate with the Special Rapporteur and the Commission of Inquiry for Human Rights in North Korea. Furthermore, they participate at the Third Committee of the General Assembly, the Social Humanitarian and Cultural Committee as well.

International Conferences and Seminars
In Seoul there has been an International Youth Conference on North Korean Human Rights, and another human rights conference every April during North Korea Freedom Week. The conferences and seminars hosted by PSCORE aim to raise awareness and educate people on topics related to reunification of the Korean peninsula  and human rights in North Korea.

Educational Programs
In Seoul, PSCORE supports North Korean defectors through education as a response to the North Korean situation where English is not taught or encouraged. Through one-on-one English tutoring and weekly English classes, North Korean defectors have resources and support to learn English for the educational standard in South Korea is increasingly adopting English as a requirement. Volunteers tutor also in essay writing, science, and math. Some North Korean defectors, when enrolled in college, are surprised at the amount of English required in their studies. Seventy-percent of PSCORE students seek help mostly in English as it is increasingly being used in South Koreans’ daily lives and workplaces.
PSCORE also organizes monthly excursions for South Koreans, North Korean defectors and foreigners to meet and participate in cultural activities together.

Helping Refugees in China
PSCORE provides basic necessities for North Korean women defectors in China such as food, medical supplies, and warm winter clothes. Orphaned children escaping from North Korea live in constant fear of being sent back. Without any legal rights, they cannot receive citizenship and cannot receive medical attention or education. PSCORE supports such children to acquire legal status to attend school and the basic necessities of housing, clothing, and financial support. There are also safety houses run by PSCORE to protect escapees from the PRC government. These houses have food, water, and electricity and are protected locations monitored by PSCORE staff.

Online Campaigns
Through online campaigning, PSCORE has held contests for university students to creatively address the issue of democratization in North Korea. South Korean students have submitted original videos and essays reflecting their views of North Korea.

Street Campaigns
In 2013, PSCORE began campaigns around Seoul to educate the public on the human rights abuses occurring within North Korea. The campaigns usually feature 20 different information boards which outline different issues. PSCORE volunteers also talk with interested people in order to give them a greater understanding of the current situation. So far campaigns have taken place at Gimpo International Airport, Dongdaemun History and Culture Park Station, Yongsan Station, Itaewon Station, Hongik University and Seoul National University of Education.

Past actions

Fundraising Concerts
Every 2–3 months from 2011 to 2015, PSCORE was hosting fundraising rock concerts entitled 'Rock out for a Good Cause' at Club Freebird in the Hongdae area of Seoul. The concerts featured both Korean and expat bands and have been very successful in helping PSCORE gain local recognition for its work, raise funds for various PSCORE programs and giving local talent a stage to play in front of up to 160 people.

PSCORE & Model UNSF 2022 
The Model United Nations Strategic framework Conference 2022 (Model UNSF) is organised by human rights advocacy group People for Successful COrean REunification. Model UNSF ultimately targets those who are currently enrolled in Universities, international organisations, institutions or companies to discuss issues surrounding North Korea in reference to the Sustainable Development Goals

Partners
    U.S. Department of State
 South Korean Ministry of Unification (통일부)
 North Korea Freedom Coalition
 Hans Seidel Stiftung (독일 한스자이델 재단 )
 North Korean Economy Watch
 National Assembly Human Rights Forum (국회인권포럼)
 North Korean Refugees Foundation (북한이탈주민후원회)
 Seoul Metropolitan Police Agency (서울 서대문경찰서)
 Korea Leaders Academy (한국지도자아카데미)
 Free North Korea Radio (자유 북한 방송)
 The Coalition for North Korean Women’s Rights (탈북여성인권연대)
 AIESEC Korea (AIESEC 서울여대)
 외대 NK
 Kookmin University (국민대 통일연습)]

References

External links 
  PSCORE (Korean) website
 PSCORE (English) website
 PSCORE’s Facebook Page
 PSCORE’s Twitter
 PSCORE’s Youtube Channel
  PSCORE Donation Page
 Interview with Kim Young-Il, Executive Director of PSCORE
 2011 North Korean Human Rights Week International Seminar

Human rights organizations based in South Korea
Human rights in North Korea
Refugee aid organizations
Defectors
Organizations specializing in North Korean issues